The history of Christianity in Mizoram covers the origin and development of all forms of Christianity in Mizoram since the British occupation at the end of the 19th century. Christianity arrived as a consequence of tribal warfare, raids of British plantations, and the ensuing punitive British military expedition called the Lushai Expedition of 1871. The subsequent annexation of the erstwhile Lushai Hills to the British Empire opened the gateway for British Christian missions to evangelise the Mizo people.

By the 1890s, the British Empire occupied all of Lushai Hills. It was still a chaotic administration as the natives were still under the influence of several tribal chiefdoms, practising animistic rituals and completely illiterate. Their rituals and tribal lifestyles were serious hindrance to law and order. There was an urgent need to introduce formal education. The solution came in the form of Christian missionaries. The pioneers were from Arthington Aborigines Mission in London, who entered Lushai Hills in 1894, the year venerated in Mizoram as the "advent of the Gospel". Although the Arthington mission was of Baptist persuasion and the first two missionaries were of the Baptist Church, the first church in Mizoram was, however, a Presbyterian Church. It was established in Aizawl in 1897 (which eventually became the capital city) by the Calvinistic Methodist Church of Wales. For this reason, the population of Mizos is largely dominated by Presbyterians. Then, the Baptist Church soon followed, setting their headquarters at Lunglei. Other denominations soon arrived, including Catholic, Salvation Army, United Pentecostal Church, Seventh-day Adventists and others. Half a century later, the Mizos by and large were converted. A variety of indigenous denominations also emerged. The new religion was immensely effective at overturning the traditional culture. Christianity turned into a new culture and ethnic identity.  By the end of 20th century, Mizoram became the most Christian populated state (and third highest in literacy rate as of 2011 census) in India, and the native population is almost entirely of Christians.

Prelude

Alexandrapur incident and British military expeditions

Before the mid-19th century Mizos were virtually unknown. The British Empire, which had occupied all the surrounding Chittagong and Burma, had little or no interest in the tribes or their hilly land. The Mizos then lived in small and isolated clusters of tribal chiefdoms, often raising warfare against each other. Their religious views were dominated by paganism and they led animistic world view, with unique concept of afterlife called Pialral. They practised elaborate rituals including animal sacrifice, and worshipped or feared almost all conceivable inanimate objects, diseases and unusual natural phenomena. The British officers used to describe them as "irreclaimable savages".

Around 1850 the Mizos started to encroach the British plantations in the neighbouring Cachar. The raid was most severe in 1871 when a series of attacks resulted in several deaths on both sides, with extensive damage on the plantations. A number of workers and soldiers were taken prisoner, and among them a six-year-old Mary Winchester. Mary Winchester was taken as hostage by Bengkhuaia warriors, while other prisoners were executed on the way. To retaliate, the British military organised punitive expedition named Lushai Expedition in 1871–1872 in the northern region. The Mizo villages were crushed one by one, and Mary Winchester was rescued. Mizo chiefs made a truce not to make further encroachments. But the truce was soon broken. In 1889 British military was forced to subjugate all the major chiefdoms throughout Mizoram (then called Lushai Hills), and got permanently fortified in major villages such as Aijal (now Aizawl) and Lungleh (now Lunglei). The land came under military occupation and subjected to the British rule.

Missionary reconnaissance

The British administration over Mizos was a hectic problem. The totally illiterate people still practised their own tribal customs, which often got in the way of law and order. The obvious option for the government was to introduce education, and a simple solution was through Christian missions. A young Welsh Presbyterian missionary Rev. William Williams who was working in Khasi Hills happened to meet Mizo prisoners at Sylhet prison in February 1891. Learning their stories he acquired a strong desire to work in Lushai Hills. With three friends he made an investigative trip in March 1891 to Aizawl. After four weeks he returned to Khasi Hills with a determination to start a mission. While the Welsh Mission approved the extension of mission in Lushai Hills in 1892, he unfortunately died of typhoid on 21 April 1892. On closer scrutiny of Williams activities during his visit, the date of his arrival, 15 March, is declared as the true "Missionary Day" by Mizoram Presbyterian Church in its 89th General Assembly in 2012.

Arthington and his mission

A different turn of events paved the way for the introduction of Gospel among Mizos. A British millionaire Robert Arthington had a strong premillennialist view that the sooner Christianity is spread in the world, the sooner would be the Second Coming of Jesus. He wanted immediate salvation. With this enthusiasm he established what he called Arthington Aborigines Mission in 1889 for evangelisation of tribal people in northeast India. For Mizos he chose J.H. Lorrain and F.W. Savidge of the London Southgate Road Baptist Church.

Arthington Aborigines Mission

The arrival of Christianity and formal education in Mizoram is due to Robert Arthington. Lorrain reached India on 1 January 1890. But not knowing further steps to take he stayed in Chittagong (now in Bangladesh) for almost two years. Then Savidge arrived in calcutta in November 1891. The two met at an evangelical campaign at Brahmanbaria (now in Bangladesh) organised by the New Zealand Baptists. They planned to start camping in Tripura, but were bluntly objected by the ruler, Maharaja. Dejected they travelled northward into deeper Chittagong. After a long wait for permission from the government to enter Lushai Hills, they were only allowed to stay at Kasalong village, the nearest possible location. This was due to constant insurgency from the Mizo tribes. After several months of starvation and dysentery they moved to Darjeeling and finally to Silchar. They waited for one whole year in 1893 for fresh permission. Fortunately while at Silchar they frequently met Mizo travellers, from whom they started learning their language. Finally, a permit was issued and they immediately set off on Tlawng River in a canoe on Boxing Day of 1893. They arrived in Aizawl on 11 January 1894. The day is now observed as public holiday as "Missionary Day" in the state. They made camp at Thingpui Huan Tlang ("Tea Graden"), MacDonald Hill, Zarkawt. They immediately worked on creating Mizo alphabets based on Roman script. After only two and half months, Savidge started the first school on 1 April 1894. Their first and only pupils were Suaka and Thangphunga. They translated and published the Gospels of Luke and John, and Acts of the Apostles. They also prepared A Grammar and Dictionary of the Lushai language (Dulien Dialect) which they published in 1898, and became the foundation of Mizo language. The Arthington Mission mandated the missionaries to move to new fields after two-three years, and had no intention of establishing churches. The mission at Aizawl was called off and was handed over to Welsh Calvinistic Methodist Mission in 1897. Lorrain and Savidge departed from Aizawl for England on 31 December 1897.

The first church

Calvinistic Methodist Church (now properly the Presbyterian Church of Wales) took over the Lushai Hills as its mission field and sent the first missionary Revd. D. E. Jones, who arrived in Aizawl on 31 August 1897. This marked the foundation of Presbyterian Church in Mizoram. Lorrain and Savidge offered him hospitality at Thingpui Huan and provided him necessary preparation for his works. After they sifted their camp at Mission Veng, to the southern part of Aizawl, Lorrain and Savidge departed. On his birthday on 15 February 1898 Jones opened a school at his bungalow which was soon used as a place of congregation meeting such as worship and Sunday schools. This organised congregation in 1898 is considered as the origin of church in Mizoram, and the establishment of Mission Veng Kohhran. An entirely separate church building was constructed only in 1913, at a place called Hriangmual bawlhmun (the current location of Mission Veng Church), which was an ancient altar of pagan worship. In August 1897, the Welsh Mission had arranged a Khasi Christian Rai Bahadur and his family from Khasi Hills to help Jones, therefore the first enlisted congregation consisted of 6 Khasis in addition to Jones and his wife.

First baptism

Two young men named Khuma and Khara became the first fully converted Christians among the Mizos. Khuma had been tutored under Lorrain and Savidge but initially showed no sign of apparent interest in the religion. But in 1898 he became more and more impressed, and with his friend Khara, they were baptised by Jones on 25 July 1899. However, the first individuals to be baptised in Lushai Hills were two Khasis, who received baptism in earlier mid-July. Khara was however not fully devoted and soon reverted to the old faith after getting into government service.

First church building

Although the first congregational worship started in Aizawl, northern Mizoram, the first independent church building was established in southern Mizoram, at a small village called Sethlun, near Lunglei. It was constructed in 1902 by outcasts from Pukpui village because of their new religion.

Baptist church

The second denomination to come up was Baptist Church. In 1901 the Welsh mission agreed to divide the Lushai Hills into two separate fields, and gave the southern part to Baptist Missionary Society (BMS) of London. BMS had received inheritance from the will of Robert Arthington, and with that they could manage the mission field of southern Lushai Hills. Their missionaries Lorrain and Savidge, of the same Arthington mission workers, arrived in Lunglei in March 1903. They were greeted by some 125 Mizo Christians from Sethlun. They settled at Serkawn and this Lunglei-annexed village became the eventual headquarters of Baptist Church in Mizoram.

Lakher Pioneer Mission

The BMS could not still cover the extreme southern corner of Lushai Hills. Lorrain therefore urged his younger brother Reginald to start a mission work among the Mara people ("Lakher" to foreigners). Reginald Arthur Lorrain and his wife Maud founded the Lakher Pioneer Mission in London in 1905. They entered Maraland (now includes southern end of Mizoram and adjoining Chin State of Burma) and settled at Serkawr (Saikao) village on 26 September 1907. The Lorrains were refused financial support by missionary societies in England, and were entirely financed by a fund-raising group based in Lorrain's home church at Penge. In the 1930s, additional finance came from Bruce Lorrain-Foxall's family and a church in Bridgnorth, Shropshire. With the additional fund few assistant missionaries joined the mission. By 1950 all Maras became converted. As an independent and self-supported mission the church had no official name until 1960, when Albert Bruce Lorrain Foxall, the son-in-law of R.A. Lorrain, gave the name "Lakher Independent Evangelical Church" at the Presbytery meeting on 26 March. "Lakher" was replaced by "Mara" at the General Assembly in 1967. After administrative separation of India and Burma in 1947–1948, Maraland was split and the Mara church got divided accordingly. The Indian counterpart became Evangelical Church of Maraland. Mara Independent Evangelical Church then faced administrative break up in 1970, to be reconciled only in 1987. The unified church became Mara Evangelical Church.

Influence of Khasi revival

In 1903 church statistics showed that there were 46 church members, of which 11 were Khasis. In January 1904 there was an upsurge of Christian revival among Khasis in Khasi Hills. Six Mizo delegates from Lushai Hills attended the Presbytery Assembly at Mairang in 1906. They received the revival spirit, and when they returned to Aizawl they spread the revival spirit among the Mizos. Evangelism then was in an unprecedented pace throughout Lushai Hills with mass conversions in almost all villages. By 1912 the figure of baptised Mizos soared to 3,999. After a year the number almost doubled (7,423). After the revival of the 1930s the entire Mizo community was considered as Christianised, except for only few individual dissenters.

Other denominations

Salvation Army was formally established on 26 April 1917 by Kawl Khuma. Khuma was a young Christian preacher. He was inspired by a military system of organisation. When he was introduced to a Salvation Army officer Booth-Tucker at Shimla, he was soon converted. He went for formal training at Bombay. In 1917 he became the first commissioned officer in India and started his mission at Aizawl, and called it Chhandama Sipai. India Eastern became a separate command on 1 June 1991 and became a territory in 1993. 
Catholicism arrived in 1925. In a brief visit from Chittagong, Fr. Boulay, CSC, baptised two infants on 6 December 1925 which marked the beginning of Catholicism. However, early opposition arose from Protestants, and as a result, the first Catholic church came up only in 1947. With permission from the Governor of Assam, two Canadian Holy Cross Fathers Fr. George Breen, CSC, and Bro. Gilbert, CSC, arrived in Mizoram on 15 April 1947. They established their headquarters at Kulikawn. 
United Pentecostal Church (UPC) emerged as an offshoot of the great spiritual revival in the 1930s, which resulted in many highly spiritualised Mizos seeking a more flexible church, particularly unsatisfied with the strictly Welsh-influenced system. Led by Zakamlova, a separate congregation was organised in Aizawl, but they lacked any denominational support. After several attempts to contact international missions, they established an "Apostolic Church" in 1948 with moral support from the Apostolic Church of Pentecost in United States. The first church was opened at Lungleng Vawkzawn village in October. However, Zakamlova knew the need to get full affiliation, so that he contacted Pentecostal Assemblies of the World worker Roxie A.R. Telie Dover, who was stationed at Bhagalpur. Upon invitation Dover visited Aizawl on 16 January 1949. Learning their enthusiasm and doctrinal inclination, Dover suggested them to join UPC. After getting government permission Rev E.L. Scisma inaugurated UPC on 19 February 1950.
 Seventh-day Adventist arrived in 1946. It was initiated by Lallianzuala Sailo, who first made contact with the Seventh-day Adventist Church at Shillong in Meghalaya in November 1946. OW Lange was the first Adventist missionary to Mizoram.

Indigenous churches

Mass conversion within half a century and frequent bursts of revivals among Mizos led to births of numerous indigenous denominations of Christianity in Mizoram found nowhere else. With extant and existing types there are more than three dozen independent churches throughout Mizoram. The reason largely being a reciprocal revival of cultural values which were strongly opposed by the founding missions. Some notable ones in terms of stronghold and popularity are:
Lalpa Kohhran Thar (The Lord's New Church), but more famously known as Chana Pawl or Ziona Pawl, was founded by Chana's brother Khuangtuaha in 1942. The extraordinary practice is polygamy of the head of the church. Chana had 30 wives. His eldest son and successor (after his death in 1997) Ziona has 39 wives and over 90 children. The church is somewhat a form of pater familias as the head is revered as supreme leader. The church itself holds a world record of the World Record Academy for being the "biggest family in the world" in 2011. They are concentrated at Baktawng village. 
Isua Krista Kohhran (Church of Jesus Christ) was started on 23 May 1970 at Bualpui NG village.  A rival sister Isua Krista Kohhran Mizoram split out on 6 April 1977. The church is spread all over Mizoram and also in parts of Tripura, Bangladesh and Burma. 
Kohhran Thianghlim (Holy Church) was founded by a veterinary doctor L.B. Sailo in 1984. It is headquartered at Chawlhhmun, Aizawl, with its notable Solomon's Temple.
Nunna Lalchhungkua was founded by evangelist Rorelliana on 27 September 1978.

See also

History of Mizoram
Mizoram Presbyterian Church
Baptist Church of Mizoram
Mizo Conference of Seventh-day Adventist
Roman Catholic Diocese of Aizawl
Evangelical Church of Maraland

References

Further reading

James Dokhuma (1975). Zoram kohhran tualto chanchinte. D. Buanga, 122 pages
Chhangte Lal Hminga (1987). The Life and Witness of the Churches in Mizoram. Literature Committee, Baptist Church of Mizoram, pages 365.
Mangkhosat Kipgen (1997). Christianity and Mizo culture: the encounter between Christianity and Zo culture in Mizoram. Mizo Theol. Conference, pages 359.
Liangkhaia. Kohhran Hrang Hrang Chanchin. L.T.L Publications, pages 122.
Liangkhaia (1976). Mizo chanchin. Mizo Academy of Letters, pages147.
Lalsangkima Pachuau (2002). Ethnic Identity and Christianity: A Socio-Historical and Missiological Study of Christianity in Northeast India with Special Reference to Mizoram. Peter Lang Pub Incorporated, pages 205. 
Reginald Arthur Lorrain (1920). The Wonderful Story of the Lakher Pioneer Mission: Founded on Prayer, Launched in Faith, February 11th, 1905, Evangelical & Inter-denominational. Lakher Pioneer Mission, pages 27 (BiblioBazaar, 2010 edition. )
Reginald Arthur Lorrain (1912). Five years in unknown jungles. Lakher Pioneer Mission, 274 pages
Saiaithanga (1969). Mizo kohhran chanchin. Regional Theological Literature Committee, 168 pages
J.V. Hluna (1985). Church & political upheaval in Mizoram: a study of impact of Christianity on the political development in Mizoram. Mizo History Association, 196 pages
V.L. Zaikima (2011). Lalpa kohhran thar: khuangtuaha pâwl-châna pâwl. Lengchhawn Press, 136 pages

External links
Population of Nine biggest Churches in Mizoram
The first church building reconstructed at Sethlun
Presbyterian Church of India, General Assembly
Bible Believing Evangelical Church (BBEC)
Mizoram Presbyterian Church Synod
Baptist Church of Mizoram
Catholic Directory of Mizoram
Catholic Diocese of Aizawl
Mizoram church
Mara Evangelical Church
Evangelical Church of Maraland
Salvation Army
Mizo Adventists

Christianity in Mizoram
History of Mizoram
History of Christianity in India